Fairview Studios is an independent recording studio located in Willerby, East Riding of Yorkshire, England. Established by a local man Keith Herd in 1966, it has recorded musical acts such as Def Leppard, Mick Ronson, Red Guitars, Mostly Autumn and The Housemartins. Over the years the facility has become well respected within the music industry.

History
Keith Herd (born 1936) hailed from Holmpton, East Riding of Yorkshire, the son of a farmer. Inspired by the music of Bill Haley and Tommy Steele, Herd formed his own outfit The Keith Herd Quartet and in 1962, recorded a demo of them in his own home in Willerby. Their then vocalist, Dave Tenney, was signed to a recording contract by Dick James, although their collective musical ambitions faded. Tenney later sang part of the novelty song, "Star Trekkin'", by The Firm which reached number one in the UK Singles Chart in 1987. Herd continued playing music locally and worked for a local music shop as a service engineer. A move in 1965 to a house named Fairview in Willerby, proved the catalyst to turn towards recording music as a career. Beginning in one of his two front rooms in the house, Herd initially recorded mainly local acts. He noted "at the time I started there were no studios in Leeds or Sheffield – even up to 1978 there still wasn’t a professional studio in Sheffield". One of the earliest recordings at Fairview was undertaken by Johnny Small and The Little People, a group which featured both Herd and Rick Kemp.

Herd also worked for a while with his eventual lifelong friend, Basil Kirchin, on early experimental pieces.

Initially charging £2.00 per hour, despite his limited equipment and experience he taped many hours of material that was issued in 2008 on the compilation album, Front Room Masters – Fairview Studios 1966–1973. Herd still played semi-professionally until 1973, when he decided to concentrate all his efforts into the recording studio. Converting a barn in his back garden, the present day version of the studio was born.

Numerous varied musical acts utilised the premises down the years, with Roy Neave and John Spence joining as sound engineers. John Spence started in 1981 and has been the studio's chief engineer for the last 25 years, guiding the studio through its 50th anniversary in 2016. More recently, the Herd family moved to North Cave and run Fairview Duplication from that location.

Selected notable recordings

Other recordings
Other notable musicians who have recorded music at Fairview include Barbara Dickson, Marty Wilde, Maddy Prior, The Glitter Band, The Beautiful South, Computerman, Shed Seven, XIII, Dumpvalve, Lithium Joe, Cannon and Ball, Kingmaker, The Farm, Bruce Foxton, Bill Nelson John Parr

Compilation album

See also
List of British recording studios

References

External links
Official website
Video recording at Fairview Studios (April 2012)
Museum exhibit of the vinyl record and cover of the original cast recording of Wilberforce. Recorded at Fairview Recording Studio, Hull

Recording studios in England
Buildings and structures in the East Riding of Yorkshire
Mass media companies established in 1966
1966 establishments in England